The 2013 World Figure Skating Championships was an international figure skating competition in the 2012–13 season. The event was held at the Budweiser Gardens in London, Ontario, Canada on March 11–17. Medals were awarded in the disciplines of men's singles, ladies' singles, pair skating, and ice dancing. The event also determined the number of entries a country may send to the 2014 World Championships and 2014 Winter Olympics.

Host
The International Skating Union selected London as the host in June 2010. Canada most recently organized the event in 2006 in Calgary, Alberta. The cost of the 2013 event was estimated at CDN $12 million. It was held at the Budweiser Gardens. Total economic activity generated in Ontario by the event was CDN $42.6 million ($32.1 million in London), resulting in net economic activity (GDP) of $23.2 million ($17.2 million in London).

Qualification
Skaters were eligible for the event if they were representing an ISU member nations and had reached the age of 15 before 1 July 2012 in their place of birth. National associations selected their entries according to their own criteria but the ISU mandated that their selections achieve a minimum technical elements score (TES) at an international event prior to the World Championships.

Minimum TES

Number of entries per discipline
Based on the results of the 2012 World Championships, the ISU allowed each country one to three entries per discipline.

Entries
Member nations submitted the following entries:

Schedule
 Wednesday, March 13
 11:00 – Pairs' short
 15:45 – Opening ceremony, Men's short
 Thursday, March 14
 10:30 – Ladies' short
 17:15 – Short dance
 Friday, March 15
 11:45 – Pairs' free, including victory ceremony
 17:45 – Men's free, including victory ceremony
 Saturday, March 16
 14:30 – Free dance, including victory ceremony
 19:00 – Ladies' free, including victory ceremony
 Sunday, March 17
 14:00 – Exhibitions

Results

Men

Ladies

Pairs

Ice dancing

Medals summary

Medalists
Medals for overall placement:

Small medals for placement in the short segment:

Small medals for placement in the free segment:

Medals by country
Table of medals for overall placement:

Table of small medals for placement in the short segment:

Table of small medals for placement in the free segment:

References

External links
 Official website
 ISU results

World Figure Skating Championships, 2013
World Figure Skating Championships
World Figure Skating Championships
Figure skating in Canada
Qualification events for the 2014 Winter Olympics
International figure skating competitions hosted by Canada
2013 in Ontario
Sports competitions in London, Ontario